Onzaga is a town and municipality in the Santander Department in northeastern Colombia. Onzaga borders in the north San Joaquín, in the east and south the municipalities Soatá, Covarachía, Tipacoque and Tutazá of the department of Boyacá and in the west with Coromoro.

History 
The area around Onzaga was inhabited by the Muisca and Onzaga was the northernmost village of their Muisca Confederation. To the north and west the Guanes populated the lower lands. When the Spanish conquistadores arrived in the central highlands of Colombia, they found indigenous peoples expert in gold working and crafts. Onzaga was famous for its wool and cotton production as well as the elaboration of the mantles.

Onzaga was ruled by the cacique of Duitama, called Tundama. The name is possibly derived from a cacique of Onzaga who was called Hunzaá (not to be confused with Hunzahúa, the first zaque of Hunza (now called Tunja)).

Modern Onzaga was founded on March 31st, 1602.

Economy 
Main economical activities of Onzaga are the production of textile, shoes, liquor and agriculture (coffee, fique, maize, beans, sugar cane and yuca). Other primary industry are livestock farming and poultry farming.

References 

Municipalities of Santander Department
Populated places established in 1602
1602 establishments in the Spanish Empire
Muisca Confederation